The knockout stage of the 2021 Rugby World Cup began on 29 October 2022 and will conclude on 12 November 2022 with the final at Eden Park in Auckland, New Zealand.

Qualified teams

Bracket

Quarter-finals

Notes:
Portia Woodman (New Zealand) equalled and subsequently surpassed England's Sue Day as the all-time World Cup top try scorer when she scored her 19th and 20th tries.

Notes:
Sarah Hunter earned her 138th test cap, surpassing Rochelle Clark as the most capped England player and most capped female player.
Sarah Bern (England) earned her 50th test cap.

Semi-finals

Notes:
This was England's 30th consecutive test victory, and became the first international team to achieve this.

Bronze final

Final

References 

Knockout